Desert hedgehog, also Desert hedgehog homolog or Dhh, is a protein encoded by the DHH gene, and is a member of the hedgehog signaling pathway. The human homolog (DHH) is on chromosome band 12q13.1.  The protein encoded by this gene is involved in cell signaling. The several mammalian variants of the Drosophila hedgehog gene (which was the first named) have been named after the various species of hedgehog; the desert hedgehog is honored by this one. The gene is not specific to desert hedgehogs.

Function 
This gene encodes a member of the hedgehog family. The hedgehog gene family encodes signaling molecules that play an important role in regulating morphogenesis. This protein is predicted to be made as a precursor that is autocatalytically cleaved; the N-terminal portion is soluble and contains the signalling activity while the C-terminal portion is involved in precursor processing. More importantly, the C-terminal product covalently attaches a cholesterol moiety to the N-terminal product, restricting the N-terminal product to the cell surface and preventing it from freely diffusing throughout the organism.

Clinical Significance 
Defects in this protein have been associated with partial gonadal dysgenesis (PGD) accompanied by minifascicular polyneuropathy. This protein may be involved in both male gonadal differentiation and perineurial development.

References

External links